A protectorate, in the context of international relations, is a state that is under protection by another state for defence against aggression and other violations of law. It is a dependent territory that enjoys autonomy over most of its internal affairs, while still recognizing the suzerainty of a more powerful sovereign state without being a possession. In exchange, the protectorate usually accepts specified obligations depending on the terms of their arrangement. Usually protectorates are established de jure by a treaty. Under certain conditions—as with Egypt under British rule (1882–1914)—a state can also be labelled as a de facto protectorate or a veiled protectorate.

A protectorate is different from a colony as it has local rulers, is not directly possessed, and rarely experiences colonization by the suzerain state. A state that is under the protection of another state while retaining its "international personality" is called a "protected state", not a protectorate.

History
Protectorates are one of the oldest features of international relations, dating back to the Roman Empire. Civitates foederatae were cities that were subordinate to Rome for their foreign relations. In the Middle Ages, Andorra was a protectorate of France and Spain. Modern protectorate concepts were devised in the nineteenth century.

Typology

Foreign relations
In practice, a protectorate often has direct foreign relations only with the protector state, and transfers the management of all its more important international affairs to the latter. Similarly, the protectorate rarely takes military action on its own but relies on the protector for its defence. This is distinct from annexation, in that the protector has no formal power to control the internal affairs of the protectorate.

Protectorates differ from League of Nations mandates and their successors, United Nations Trust Territories, whose administration is supervised, in varying degrees, by the international community. A protectorate formally enters into the protection through a bilateral agreement with the protector, while international mandates are stewarded by the world community-representing body, with or without a  administering power.

Protected state

A protected state has a form of protection where it continues to retain an "international personality" and enjoys an agreed amount of independence in conducting its foreign policy.

For political and pragmatic reasons, the protection relationship is not usually advertised, but described with euphemisms such as "an independent state with special treaty relations" with the protecting state. A protected state appears on world maps just as any other independent state.

International administration of a state can also be regarded as an internationalized form of protection, where the protector is an international organisation rather than a state.

Colonial protection
Multiple regions—such as the Colony and Protectorate of Nigeria, the Colony and Protectorate of Lagos, and similar—were subjects of colonial protection. Conditions of protection are generally much less generous for areas of colonial protection. The protectorate was often reduced to a  condition similar to a colony, but with the pre-existing native state continuing as the agent of indirect rule. Occasionally, a protectorate was established by another form of indirect rule: a chartered company, which becomes a  state in its European home state (but geographically overseas), allowed to be an independent country with its own foreign policy and generally its own armed forces.

In fact, protectorates were often declared despite no agreement being duly entered into by the state supposedly being protected, or only agreed to by a party of dubious authority in those states. Colonial protectors frequently decided to reshuffle several protectorates into a new, artificial unit without consulting the protectorates, without being mindful of the theoretical duty of a protector to help maintain a protectorate's status and integrity. The Berlin agreement of February 26, 1885, allowed European colonial powers to establish protectorates in Black Africa (the last region to be divided among them) by diplomatic notification, even without actual possession on the ground. This aspect of history is referred to as the Scramble for Africa. A similar case is the formal use of such terms as colony and protectorate for an amalgamation—convenient only for the colonizer or protector—of adjacent territories, over which it held sway by protective or "raw" colonial power.

Amical protection
In amical protection—as of United States of the Ionian Islands by Britain—the terms are often very favourable for the protectorate. The political interest of the protector is frequently moral (a matter of accepted moral obligation, prestige, ideology, internal popularity, or dynastic, historical, or ethnocultural ties). Also, the protector's interest is in countering a rival or enemy power—such as preventing the rival from obtaining or maintaining control of areas of strategic importance. This may involve a very weak protectorate surrendering control of its external relations but may not constitute any real sacrifice, as the protectorate may not have been able to have a similar use of them without the protector's strength.

Amical protection was frequently extended by the great powers to other Christian (generally European) states, and to states of no significant importance. After 1815, non-Christian states (such as the Chinese Qing dynasty) also provided amical protection of other, much weaker states.

In modern times, a form of amical protection can be seen as an important or defining feature of microstates. According to the definition proposed by Dumienski (2014): "microstates are modern protected states, i.e. sovereign states that have been able to unilaterally depute certain attributes of sovereignty to larger powers in exchange for benign protection of their political and economic viability against their geographic or demographic constraints".

Argentina's protectorates
  Liga Federal (1815–1820)
  Peru (1820–1822)
  Riograndense Republic (1836-1845)
  Juliana Republic (1839-1845)
  Gobierno del Cerrito (1843–1851)
  Paraguay (1876)

De facto
  Republic of Tucumán (1820–1821)
  National Territory of Misiones (1865–1954)
  National Territory of the Gran Chaco (1874–1884)
  National Territory of the Patagonia (1878–1884)
  National Territory of the Tierra del Fuego, Antarctica and South Atlantic Islands (1884–1991)

Brazil's protectorates
  Republic of Acre (1899-1903)

British Empire's protectorates and protected states

Americas
  (1655–1860; over Central America's Miskito Indian nation)

Europe
   Malta Protectorate  (1800–1813);  Crown Colony of Malta proclaimed in 1813) (de jure part of the Kingdom of Sicily but under British protection)
  Ionian islands (1815–1864) (a Greek state and amical protectorate of Great Britain between 1815 and 1864)
  British Cyprus (1871–1914) (put under British military administration 1914–22 then proclaimed a Crown Colony 1922–60)

South Asia
  Cis-Sutlej states (1809–1862)
  (1816–1923; protected state)
  Princely states (1857–1947; vassal states)
  (1861–1947)
  Maldive Islands (1887–1965)
  (1879–1919; protected state)
  (1910–1947; protected state)

Western Asia
  British Residency of the Persian Gulf (1822–1971); headquarters based in Bushire, Persia
 , protected state (1880–1971)
  Sheikhdom of Kuwait, protected state (1899–1961)
  Qatar, protected state (1916–1971)
 ; precursor state of the UAE, protected states (1892–1971)
  Abu Dhabi (1820–1971)
  Ajman (1820–1971)
  Dubai (1835–1971)
  Fujairah (1952–1971)
  Ras Al Khaimah (1820–1971)
  Sharjah (1820–1971)
  Kalba (1936–1951)
  Umm al-Qaiwain (1820–1971)
  (1892–1971; informal, protected state)
  Aden Protectorate (1872–1963); precursor state of South Yemen
 Eastern Protectorate States (mostly in Haudhramaut); later the Protectorate of South Arabia (1963–1967)
  Kathiri
  Mahra
  Qu'aiti
  Upper Yafa (consisted of five Sheikhdoms: Al-Busi, Al-Dhubi, Hadrami, Maflahi, and Mawsata)
  Hawra
  Irqa
 Western Protectorate States; later the Federation of South Arabia (1959/1962–1967), including Aden Colony
  Wahidi Sultanates (these included: Balhaf, Azzan, Bir Ali, and Habban)
  Beihan
  Dhala and Qutaibi
  Fadhli
  Lahej
  Lower Yafa
  Audhali
  Haushabi
  Upper Aulaqi Sheikhdom
  Upper Aulaqi Sultanate
  Lower Aulaqi
  Alawi
  Aqrabi
  Dathina
  Shaib

Africa

  (1884–1960)
  Bechuanaland Protectorate (1885–1966)
  Protectorate (1889–1964)
  Nyasaland Protectorate (1893–1964) ( British Central Africa Protectorate from 1889 until 1907)
  (1890–1963)
  Gambia Colony and Protectorate* (1894–1965)
  Uganda Protectorate (1894–1962)
  East Africa Protectorate (1895–1920)
  Sierra Leone Protectorate* (1896–1961)
  Nigeria* (1914-1960)
  Northern Nigeria Protectorate (1900–1914)
  Swaziland (1903–1968)
  Southern Nigeria Protectorate (1900–1914)
  Northern Territories of the Gold Coast (British protectorate) (1901–1957)
  Sultanate of Egypt (1914–1922)
  Kenya Protectorate* (1920–1963)
  (1922–1936)
  (1924–1964)
*protectorates which existed alongside a colony of the same name

De facto
  Khediviate of Egypt (1882–1913)

Oceania
  (1884–1888)
  Tokelau (1877–1916)
  Cook Islands (1888–1893)
  (1892–1916)
  British Solomon Islands (1893–1978)
  Niue (1900–1901)
  (1900–1970)

East and Southeast Asia
  British North Borneo (1888–1946)
  (1888–1984)
  (1888–1946)
  Federation of Malaya (1948–1957)
  (1895–1946)
  (1888–1895)
  Sungai Ujong (1874–1888)
  Jelebu (1886–1895)1946)
  (1888–1895)
  (1874–1895)
  (1874–1895)
  Unfederated Malay States (1904/09–1946)
  (1914–1946)
  Muar (1897–1909)
  (1909–1946)
  Kulim (1894–1909)
  (1909–1946)
  (1909–1946)
  (1909–1946)

China's protectorates

 Han dynasty:
 Protectorate of the Western Regions
 Tang dynasty:
 Protectorate General to Pacify the West
 Protectorate General to Pacify the North
 Protectorate General to Pacify the East
 Yuan dynasty:
  Goryeo (1270–1356)
 Qing dynasty:
 Tibet

Dutch Empire's protectorates
Various sultanates in the Dutch East Indies (present day Indonesia):

Sumatra
 Trumon Sultanate (1770?)
 Langkat Sultanate (26 October 1869)
 Deli Sultanate (22 August 1862)
 Asahan Sultanate (27 September 1865)
 Kota Pinang Sultanate (1865 - 1942)
 Siak Sultanate (1 February 1858)
 Indragiri Sultanate (1838?)

Java
 Jogjakarta Sultanate (13 February 1755)
 Mataram Empire and Surakarta Sunanate (26 February 1677)
 Duchy of Mangkunegara (24 February 1757)
 Duchy of Paku Alaman (22 June 1812)

Lesser Sunda Islands 
 Sumbawa Sultanate (?)
 Bima Sultanate (8 December 1669)

Borneo 
 Pontianak Sultanate (16 August 1819)
 Sambas Sultanate (1819)
 Kubu Sultanate (4 June 1823)
 Landak Sultanate (?)
 Mempawah Sultanate (?)
 Matan Sultanate (?)
 Sanggau Sultanate (?)
 Sekadau Sultanate (?)
 Simpang Sultanate (?)
 Sintang Sultanate (1822)
 Sukadana Sultanate (?)
 Kota Waringin Sultanate (?)
 Kutai Kertanegara Sultanate (8 August 1825)
 Gunung Tabur Sultanate (?)
 Bulungan Sultanate (?)

Celebes 
 Gowa Sultanate (1669)
 Bone Sultanate (?)
 Sidenreng Sultanate (?)
 Soppeng Sultanate (?)
 Butung Sultanate (?)
 Muna Sultanate (?)
 Banggai Sultanate (?)

The Moluccas 
 Ternate Sultanate (12 October 1676)
 Batjan Sultanate (?)

New Guinea 
 Dutch New Guinea:
 Kaimana Sultanate (?)

France's protectorates and protected states

Africa
"Protection" was the formal legal structure under which French colonial forces expanded in Africa between the 1830s and 1900. Almost every pre-existing state that was later part of French West Africa was placed under protectorate status at some point, although direct rule gradually replaced protectorate agreements. Formal ruling structures, or fictive recreations of them, were largely retained—as with the low-level authority figures in the French Cercles—with leaders appointed and removed by French officials.

 Benin traditional states
 Independent of  Danhome, under French protectorate, from 1889
 Porto-Novo a French protectorate, 23 February 1863 – 2 January 1865. Cotonou a French Protectorate, 19 May 1868. Porto-Novo French protectorate, 14 April 1882.
 Central African Republic traditional states:
 French protectorate over Dar al-Kuti (1912 Sultanate suppressed by the French), 12 December 1897
 French protectorate over the Sultanate of Bangassou, 1894
 Burkina Faso was since 20 February 1895 a French protectorate named Upper Volta (Haute-Volta)
 Chad: Baghirmi state 20 September 1897 a French protectorate
 Côte d'Ivoire: 10 January 1889 French protectorate of Ivory Coast
 Guinea: 5 August 1849 French protectorate over coastal region; (Riviéres du Sud).
 Niger, Sultanate of Damagaram (Zinder), 30 July 1899 under French protectorate over the native rulers, titled Sarkin Damagaram or Sultan
 Senegal: 4 February 1850 First of several French protectorate treaties with local rulers
 Comoros21 April 1886 French protectorate (Anjouan) until 25 July 1912 when annexed.
 Present Djibouti was originally, since 24 June 1884, the Territory of Obock and Protectorate of Tadjoura (Territoires Français d'Obock, Tadjoura, Dankils et Somalis), a French protectorate recognized by Britain on 9 February 1888, renamed on 20 May 1896 as French Somaliland (Côte Française des Somalis).
 Mauritania: 12 May 1903 French protectorate; within Mauritania several traditional states:
 Adrar emirate since 9 January 1909 French protectorate (before Spanish)
 The Taganit confederation's emirate (founded by Idaw `Ish dynasty), since 1905 under French protectorate.
 Brakna confederation's emirate
 Emirate of Trarza: 15 December 1902 placed under French protectorate status.
  Morocco – most of the sultanate was under French protectorate (30 March 1912 – 7 April 1956) although, in theory, it remained a sovereign state under the Treaty of Fez; this fact was confirmed by the International Court of Justice in 1952.
 The northern part of Morocco was under Spanish protectorate in the same period.
 Traditional Madagascar States
  Kingdom of Imerina under French protectorate, 6 August 1896. French Madagascar colony, 28 February 1897.
  Tunisia (12 May 1881 – 20 March 1956): became a French protectorate by treaty

Americas
  Second Mexican Empire (1863-1867), established by Emperor Napoleon III during the Second French intervention in Mexico and ruled by the Austrian-born, French puppet monarch Maximilian I

Asia

 French Indochina until 1953/54:
  Annam and Tonkin 6 June 1884
  Cambodia 11 August 1863
  Laos 3 October 1893
  Vietnam 6 June 1884

Europe
  Rhenish Republic (1923–1924)
  Saar Protectorate (1947–1956), not colonial or amical, but a former part of Germany that would by referendum return to it, in fact a re-edition of a former League of Nations mandate. Most French protectorates were colonial.

Oceania
  French Polynesia, mainly the Society Islands (several others were immediately annexed). All eventually were annexed by 1889.
 Otaheiti (native king styled Ari`i rahi) becomes a French protectorate known as Tahiti, 1842–1880
 Raiatea and Tahaa (after temporary annexation by Otaheiti; (title Ari`i) a French protectorate, 1880)
 Mangareva (one of the Gambier Islands; ruler title `Akariki) a French protectorate, 16 February 1844 (unratified) and 30 November 1871
  Wallis and Futuna:
  Wallis declared to be a French protectorate by King of Uvea and Captain Mallet, 4 November 1842. Officially in a treaty becomes a French protectorate, 5 April 1887.
  Sigave and  Alo on the islands of Futuna and Alofi signed a treaty establishing a French protectorate on 16 February 1888.

Germany's protectorates and protected states

The German Empire used the word , literally protectorate, for all of its colonial possessions until they were lost during World War I, regardless of the actual level of government control. Cases involving indirect rule included:
  German New Guinea (1884–1914), now part of Papua New Guinea
  German South West Africa (1884–1914), present-day Namibia
  Togoland (1884–1914), now part of Ghana and Togo
  North Solomon Islands (1885–1914), now part of Papua New Guinea and the Solomon Islands
  Wituland (1885–1890), now part of Kenya
  Ruanda-Urundi (1894–1916)
  German Samoa (1900–1914), present-day Samoa
  Marshall Islands
  Nauru, various officials posted with the Head Chiefs
  Gando Emirate (1895-1897)
  Gulmu (1895-1897)

Before and during World War II, Nazi Germany designated the rump of occupied Czechoslovakia and Denmark as protectorates:
  Protectorate of Bohemia and Moravia (1939–1945)
  Denmark (1940–1943)

India's protectorates
  Bhutan (1947–present; protected state).
  Kingdom of Sikkim (1950–1975), later acceded to India as State of Sikkim.

Italy's protectorates and protected states
  The Albanian Republic (1917–1920) and the  Albanian Kingdom (1939–1943)
  Monaco under amical Protectorate of the Kingdom of Sardinia 20 November 1815 to 1860.
  Ethiopia : 2 May 1889 Treaty of Wuchale, in the Italian language version, stated that Ethiopia was to become an Italian protectorate, while the Ethiopian Amharic language version merely stated that the Emperor could, if he so chose, go through Italy to conduct foreign affairs. When the differences in the versions came to light, Emperor Menelik II abrogated first the article in question (XVII), and later the whole treaty. The event culminated in the First Italo-Ethiopian War, in which Ethiopia was victorious and defended her sovereignty in 1896.
  Libya: on 15 October 1912 Italian protectorate declared over Cirenaica (Cyrenaica) until 17 May 1919.
  Benadir Coast in Somalia: 3 August 1889  Italian protectorate (in the northeast; unoccupied until May 1893), until 16 March 1905 when it changed to  Italian Somaliland.
  Majeerteen Sultanate since 7 April 1889 under Italian protectorate (renewed 7 April 1895), then in 1927 incorporated into the Italian colony.
  Sultanate of Hobyo since December 1888 under Italian protectorate (renewed 11 April 1895), then in October 1925 incorporated into the Italian colony (known as Obbia).

Japan's protectorates
  Korean Empire (1905–1910)
  Manchukuo (1932–1945)
  Mengjiang (1939–1945)

Poland's protectorates
  Kaffa (1462–1475)

Portugal's protectorates
 Cabinda (Portuguese Congo) (1885–1974), Portugal first claimed sovereignty over Cabinda in the February 1885 Treaty of Simulambuco, which gave Cabinda the status of a protectorate of the Portuguese Crown under the request of "the princes and governors of Cabinda".
 Kingdom of Kongo (1857–1914)
 Gaza Empire (1824–1895), now part of Mozambique
 Angoche Sultanate (1903–1910)

Russia's and the Soviet Union's protectorates and protected states
  Kingdom of Kartli-Kakheti (1783–1801)
  Kingdom of Imereti (1804–1810)
  Revolutionary Serbia (1807–1812)
  Principality of Serbia (1826–1856), now part of Serbia
  Moldavia (1829–1856), now part of Moldova, Romania and Ukraine
  Wallachia (1829–1856)
 Emirate of Bukhara (1873–1920)
  Khanate of Khiva (1873–1920)
  Uryankhay Krai (1914)
  Second East Turkestan Republic (1944–1949), now part of Xinjiang, China

De facto

Some sources mention the following territories as de facto Russian protectorates:

  South Ossetia (2008–present)
  Transnistria (1992–present)
   Abkhazia (1994–present)
  Donetsk People's Republic (2015–2022)
  Luhansk People's Republic (2015–2022)
  Republic of Artsakh (2020–present)

Spain's protectorates
  Spanish Morocco protectorate from 27 November 1912 until 2 April 1958 (Northern zone until 7 April 1956, Southern zone (Cape Juby) until 2 April 1958).

Turkey's and the Ottoman Empire's protectorates and protected states

  Aceh Sultanate (1569–1903)
  Maldives (1560–1590)
  Cossack Hetmanate (1669–1685)

De facto
  Northern Cyprus (1983–present)

United Nations' protectorates
  United Nations Transitional Administration in East Timor (1999–2002)
  United Nations Transitional Authority in Cambodia 1992-1993
  United Nations Interim Administration Mission in Kosovo 1999–present(only de jure since 2008)
  United Nations Temporary Executive Authority 1962-1963
  United Nations Transitional Administration for Eastern Slavonia, Baranja and Western Sirmium 1996-1998

United States' protectorates and protected states
Hawaiian Kingdom, 1795-1893
  Liberia (1822–1847)
  Republic of Texas (1836-1845)
  Cuba (1898–1934)
  Republic of Negros (1899–1901)
  Republic of Zamboanga (1899–1903)
  Sultanate of Sulu (1903–1915)
  Philippines (1935–1946), under the provisions of the Tydings–McDuffie Act, the territory would become self-governing although its military and foreign affairs would be under the United States.
  Iraq (2003–2004)

Contemporary usage by the United States
Some agencies of the United States government, such as the Environmental Protection Agency, still refer to insular areas of the United States—such as Guam, the Northern Mariana Islands, Puerto Rico, and the U.S. Virgin Islands—as protectorates. However, the agency responsible for the administration of those areas, the Office of Insular Affairs (OIA) within the United States Department of Interior, uses only the term "insular area" rather than protectorate. The Philippines and (it can be argued via the Platt Amendment) Cuba at the end of Spanish colonial rule were also protectorates. Liberia was the only African nation that was a colony of the United States; but the US government had no control over the land, as it was controlled by the privately owned American Colonization Society. It was, however, a protectorate from January 7, 1822, until the Liberian Declaration of Independence from the American Colonization Society on July 26, 1847.

  Panama Canal Zone (1903–1979)
  Puerto Rico
  Northern Mariana Islands
  Guam
  U.S. Virgin Islands

De facto
  Territory of Alaska (1867–1958)
  Territory of Hawaii (1893/1898–1959)
  Haiti (1915–1934)
   Dominican Republic (1916–1924)

Joint protectorates

  Republic of Ragusa (1684–1798), a joint Habsburg Austrian–Ottoman Turkish protectorate
 The  United States of the Ionian Islands and the  Septinsular Republic were federal republics of seven formerly Venetian (see Provveditore) Ionian islands (Corfu, Cephalonia, Zante, Santa Maura, Ithaca, Cerigo, and Paxos), officially under joint protectorate of the Allied Christian Powers,  a British amical protectorate from 1815 to 1864.
   Anglo-Egyptian Sudan (1899–1956)
  Independent State of Croatia (1941–1943)
  Allied-occupied Germany (1945–1949)
  Allied-occupied Austria (1945–1955)

See also
 British Protected Person
 Client state
 European Union Police Mission in Bosnia and Herzegovina
 EUFOR Althea
 High Representative for Bosnia and Herzegovina
 League of Nations mandate
 Peace Implementation Council
 Protector (titles for Heads of State and other individual persons)
 Protectorate (imperial China)
 Suzerainty
 Puerto Rico
 Timeline of national independence
 Tribute

Notes

References

Bibliography
 
 
 
 
 
 

Client state
 
Constitutional state types